Donald Everett LeJohn (May 13, 1934 in Daisytown, Pennsylvania – February 25, 2005 in California, Pennsylvania) was a Major League Baseball third baseman and Minor League Baseball manager during his long career in professional baseball.

LeJohn was signed by the Brooklyn Dodgers in 1954 and played in the minor leagues through 1971 with various Dodgers affiliates.  He was a minor league All-Star in 1954, 1955 and 1964.  LeJohn made one stop in the majors, with the Los Angeles Dodgers in 1965 and had one at-bat as a pinch-hitter in the World Series that year. He struck out swinging in the ninth inning of game 1.

LeJohn started managing as a player/manager with the Tri-City Atoms in the Northwest League in 1967 and continued to manage in the Dodgers' farm system for 20 years after he finished playing.

The teams he managed:
Tri-City Atoms (1967–1968)
Bakersfield Dodgers (1969–1972)
Waterbury Dodgers (1973–1976)
San Antonio Dodgers (1977–1982)
Lodi Dodgers (1983)
Bakersfield Dodgers (1984, 1986)

LeJohn finished with a career managerial record of 1243–1238, and  won two league championships.

References

External links

Baseball players from Pennsylvania
1934 births
2005 deaths
Los Angeles Dodgers players
Los Angeles Dodgers scouts
Macon Dodgers players
Major League Baseball third basemen
Minor league baseball managers
Shawnee Hawks players
Great Falls Electrics players
Wichita Falls Spudders players
Des Moines Bruins players
Asheville Tourists players
Atlanta Crackers players
Omaha Dodgers players
Spokane Indians players
Albuquerque Dukes players
Tri-City Atoms players
People from Cambria County, Pennsylvania